Heterachthes v-flavum is a species of beetle in the family Cerambycidae. It was described by Martins in 2009. Under Article 31.2.1 of the International Code of Zoological Nomenclature, the species name must be spelled v-flavum, despite being originally spelled v-flavus by the original author, as letters of the alphabet are neuter in gender.

References

Heterachthes
Beetles described in 2009